Welch House may refer to:

in the United Kingdom
Welch House, Church Road, Onchan, Isle of Man, one of Isle of Man's Registered Buildings

in the United States
Welch-Averiett House, Sylacauga, Alabama, listed on the National Register of Historic Places (NRHP)
William Welch House, Canehill, Arkansas, NRHP-listed
Welch Pottery Works, Tulip, Arkansas, NRHP-listed
Welch-Hurst, Saratoga, California, NRHP-listed
David Welch House, Milton, Connecticut, NRHP-listed
Welch Training School, New Haven, Connecticut, NRHP-listed
Edward Welch House, Boise, Idaho, NRHP-listed
Welch Apartments, Muscatine, Iowa, NRHP-listed
Andrew Welch Homestead, Parsonsfield, Maine, NRHP-listed
Jenkins H. Welch House, Hazelhurst, Mississippi, NRHP-listed
William H. Welch House, Baltimore, Maryland, NRHP-listed
Welch Factory Building No. 1, Westfield, New York, NRHP-listed
Shook-Welch-Smathers House, Clyde, North Carolina, NRHP-listed
Welch-Nicholson House and Mill Site, Houstonville, North Carolina, NRHP-listed
J.C. Welch House, Muskogee, Oklahoma, NRHP-listed
Mathias Welch House, Central Point, Oregon, NRHP-listed
L.J. Welch House, Mitchell, South Dakota, NRHP-listed
Laura M Welch House, Sioux Falls, South Dakota, NRHP-listed
Baird-Welch House, Cornersville, Tennessee, NRHP-listed
Welch-Sherman House, Park City, Utah, NRHP-listed
C.A. Welch House, Waukesha, Wisconsin, NRHP-listed

See also
Willard Memorial Chapel-Welch Memorial Hall, Auburn, New York, NRHP-listed
Welch Commercial Historic District, Welch, West Virginia, NRHP-listed